KADS may refer to:

 KADS 1240 kHz, a radio station in Elk City, Oklahoma, United States
 KOST 103.5 MHz, a radio station in Los Angeles, California, United States that used the KADS callsign from 1966 to 1968
 Knowledge Acquisition and Documentation Structuring, a structured method of developing expert systems
 The ICAO airport code for Addison Airport in Addison, Texas, United States
 Kutcher Adolescent Depression Scale, an adolescent depression rating scale